Blagoje Parović (Serbian Cyrillic: Благоје Паровић; 25 March 1903 – 7 July 1937) was a member of the Central Committee of the Communist Party of Yugoslavia and served as a political commissar in the Spanish Civil War.

Early life 
Parović was born on 25 March 1903 in the village Biograd near Nevesinje. His parents Petar and Gospava were poor peasants. Both of his parents died in his early years. His mother died first while his father Petar was killed by soldiers of Austria-Hungary during the First World War. After death of his parents Parović went to Vinkovci where he was educated as shoemaker. His younger brother Rade was taken to Gradiška.

Spanish Civil War 
Parović was commissar of the XIII International Brigade during the Spanish Civil War. According to communist published works, Parović died on 7 July 1937 in the Battle of Brunete, heading his brigade during one assault toward well-defended enemy positions.  knew the exact position of his death. Begović was known as executor of the Communist Party enemies. In his 1990 interview to Politika, Vladimir Dedijer stated that Peko Dapčević openly spoke about the possible role of Begović in the murder of Blagoje Parović.

Legacy 
The central square in Nevesinje, his birth town, is named after Parović. A street in Belgrade, the capital of Serbia, Novi Sad, the capital of Serbia's northern province Vojvodina, and Niš, the third largest city in the country, are named after Parović.

References

Further reading 
 Milorad Gončin - Blagoje Parović, Narodna Armija, 1984

1903 births
1937 deaths
People from Nevesinje
Serbs of Bosnia and Herzegovina
Central Committee of the League of Communists of Yugoslavia members
International Brigades personnel
International Lenin School alumni
Burials in Madrid